Tipula lunata is a species of cranefly which is widespread throughout the Palaearctic.

References

External links
Images representing Tipula at BOLD

Tipulidae
Nematoceran flies of Europe
Insects described in 1758
Taxa named by Carl Linnaeus